Superior thyroid may refer to:
 Superior thyroid artery
 Superior thyroid vein